The Superior Court of California, County of Amador, also known as the Amador County Superior Court, is the branch of the California superior court with jurisdiction over Amador County.

History
Amador County was formed in 1854 from the northern section of what was Calaveras County, named for José María Amador.

The first courthouse was a two-story wooden building completed in January 1855 at 108 Court Street, serving until August 1862, when it was destroyed by fire. A new brick courthouse was completed at the same site in December 1863, designed by S.D. Mandell. A neighboring building was completed as the Hall of Records in 1893 to a design by T.J. Welch, and the courthouse was expanded into the space between the two buildings around 1920. The 1863, 1893, and 1920 interstitial buildings were merged and given an Art Deco renovation in 1939; the combined courthouse building was re-dedicated on June 29, 1940.

In 2007, a new County courthouse was completed at 500 Argonaut Lane, replacing the 1863/1940 courthouse. Court operations moved to the new location on June 25, 2007.

References

External links
 
 

Superior Court
Superior courts in California